Avdya may refer to:
Avdya, a diminutive of the Russian male first name Avdelay
Avdya, a diminutive of the Russian male first name Avdey
Avdya, a diminutive of the Russian male first name Avdiky
Avdya, a diminutive of the Russian male first name Avdon